Aranoethra is a genus of African orb-weaver spiders first described by Arthur Gardiner Butler in 1873.  it contains only three species.

References

Araneidae
Araneomorphae genera
Spiders of Africa
Taxa named by Arthur Gardiner Butler